The Journal of Endocrinology is a monthly peer-reviewed scientific journal that publishes original research articles, reviews and commentaries. Its focus is on endocrine physiology and metabolism, including hormone secretion, hormone action, and biological effects. The journal considers basic and translational studies at the organ and whole organism level.

The journal is published by Bioscientifica on behalf of the Society for Endocrinology. It is also an official journal of the European Society of Endocrinology and the Endocrine Society of Australia. The co-editors-in-chief are Martin Haluzík (Charles University) and Colin Farquharson (University of Edinburgh). According to the Journal Citation Reports, the journal has a 2020 impact factor of 4.286.

History
The journal was conceived by Sir Charles Dodds Bart FRS (the founding editor-in-chief), Sir Frank Young FRS, Sir Alan Parkes FRS, and Lord Solly Zuckerman OM KCB FRS in 1937. The first issue was published in 1939 (it took two years to process the papers from draft manuscript to print) and contained 45 research articles. By 1946, five volumes had been published.

In February 1946, 22 previous contributors unanimously resolved to form the Society for Endocrinology and invited all previous authors to be founding members. Editorial board member Alan Parkes was elected as the society's first chairman.

From 1946, the number of issues that the journal published gradually increased. From 1953 to 1960 there were between five and seven issues published each year, and from 1961 to 1965 there were eight to nine issues. Since 1966, the journal has been published monthly. The technological explosion of the 1970s and 1980s, exemplified by the development of recombinant DNA techniques, DNA sequencing, and the invention of PCR, resulted in an increase in research output in the areas of molecular and genetic endocrinology. In response to this, a sister journal entitled Journal of Molecular Endocrinology was founded in 1988.

In 2006, the Journal of Endocrinology was adopted as an official journal of the European Society of Endocrinology and, in 2014, of the Endocrine Society of Australia. 

The regular use of molecular biology methods in work published in the journal, as well as its molecular-focused sister journal, often resulted in a blurred line between the subject areas covered. Consequently, in 2011 it was decided by the Publications Committee of the Society for Endocrinology that the two journals would have a single joint editorial board. This came into being at the start of 2012. While papers would still be submitted to one or other of the journals, the senior editors would have the opportunity to suggest that manuscripts be transferred between publications.

Editors–in–chief
The following people are or have been editor-in-chief:
 1975–1980: Bernard Donovan
 1981–1984: Alf Cowie
 1985–1992: Gavin Vinson
 1993–1999: Alan McNeilly
 2000–2004: Steve Hillier
 2005–2008: Julian Davis
 2009–2015: Adrian Clark
 2015–2019: Sofianos Andrikopoulos
 2018–present: Colin Farquharson
 2019–present: Martin Haluzík

Online access
The journal was first published online in September 1997 in PDF format. From October 2004, the online offering was extended to include the HTML full text version of articles. All peer-reviewed editorial and review content is free to access from publication. For the first 12 months, research articles are accessible for those at subscribing institutions and members of the Society for Endocrinology and the European Society of Endocrinology before being made available to the public for free (delayed open access). In addition, the journal offers a Gold open access option (hybrid open access).

Abstracting and indexing
The journal is abstracted and indexed in:

According to the Journal Citation Reports, the journal has a 2020 impact factor of 4.286.

References

External links

Endocrine Society of Australia

Endocrinology journals
Publications established in 1939
Monthly journals
English-language journals
Bioscientifica academic journals
Academic journals associated with learned and professional societies